United Nations Security Council resolution 686, adopted on 2 March 1991, after reaffirming resolutions 660, 661, 662, 664, 665, 666, 667, 669, 670, 674, 677 and 678 (all 1990), the council noted the suspension of military activities against Iraq and that all twelve resolutions continue to have full force and effect.

The resolution went on to demand that Iraq implement these twelve resolutions, as well as rescind its actions regarding the annexation of Kuwait; accept liability under international law for any loss, damage or injury in Kuwait; release any Kuwaiti or foreign nationals alive or deceased; and return any property seized by Iraq.

Resolution 686 also demanded that Iraq:

(a) end hostile and provocative actions by its forces against all Member States, including missile attacks;
(b) arrange for a ceasefire at the earliest possible time by designating military commanders to meet with its foreign counterparts;
(c) arrange for the release and immediate access to all prisoners of war under the auspices of the International Committee of the Red Cross;
(d) provide information identifying Iraqi mines, booby traps as well as any chemical and biological weapons in land or water.

The council also requested international organisations as well as agencies of the United Nations to co-operate with the Government of Kuwait in the reconstruction of their country, deciding that Iraq should inform the Secretary-General and Security Council when it has undertaken actions set out in the current resolution.

Resolution 686 was passed by 11 votes to 1 against (Cuba) with three abstentions from China, India, and Yemen.

Iraq later made concessions on 5 March relating the resolution, including the repeal of Iraqi laws and regulations in Kuwait.

See also
 Gulf War
 Invasion of Kuwait
 Iraq–Kuwait relations
 List of United Nations Security Council Resolutions 601 to 700 (1987–1991)

References

External links
 
Text of the Resolution at undocs.org

 0686
History of Kuwait
Gulf War
 0686
1991 in Kuwait
1991 in Iraq
 0686
March 1991 events